Glaeser's theorem may refer to:

Glaeser's composition theorem
Glaeser's continuity theorem